P-pop can refer to:
Pakistani pop music
Persian pop, pop music of Iran
Pinoy pop, pop music of the Philippines
"P-Poppin", a 2003 song by Ludacris
P-Pop-High School, a 2009 album by Peelander-Z